The following is a timeline of the history of the city of Latakia, Syria.

Prior to 20th century

 183 CE - Latakia Tetraporticus built.
 330 CE - Now part of the Eastern Roman Empire
 494 CE - Earthquake.
 528 CE - Declared capital of the Byzantine province of Theodorias.
 637 CE - Part of the Rashidun Caliphate
 616 CE - Part of the Umayyad Caliphate
 750 CE - Part of the Abbasid Caliphate
 1102 - Tancred in power.
 1104 - Battle of Harran and reoccupation by the Byzantine Empire
 1170 - Earthquake.
 1188 - Part of the Ayyubid Sultanate.
 1287
 al-Mansur Qala'un in power.
 Earthquake.
 1332 - Ibn Battuta visited the city during his travels
 1725 - Sulayman Pasha al-'Azm of Tripoli in power.
 1752 - 21 July: Earthquake.
 1822 - Earthquake.
 1829 - Franciscan monastery built.
 1880 - Literary society founded.

20th century

 1909 - April: Influx of refugees.
 1920 - Latakia becomes part of the Alawite State of the French Mandate for Syria and the Lebanon.
 1932 - Population: 24,000.
 1933 - Church of the Sacred Heart of Jesus built.
 1942
 "France reunites ... Latakia with the rest of Syria."
 July: "Explosion in a government building."
 1943 - Population: 36,000.
 1945 - Hutteen Sporting Club formed.
 1947 - Tishreen Sports Club formed.
 1950s - Port of Latakia expanded.
 1955 - Latakia Camp of Palestinian refugees established.
 1957 - Population: 56,000.
 1970s - Ras Ibn Hani archaeological site discovered near Latakia.
 1970 - Population: 125,716.
 1971 - University of Latakia established.
 1973 - 7 October: Battle of Latakia occurs offshore.
 1978 - Al-Assad Stadium opens.
 1980 - Marine Research Center built.
 1985 - Population: 229,944 (estimate).
 1986 - National Museum of Latakia inaugurated.
 1987
 Latakia Sports City Stadium opens.
 September: 1987 Mediterranean Games held.
 Population: 241,000.
 1989 - Naissa Mosque built.
 1994 - Population: 303,000.

21st century

 2004
26 May 2004: Birth of Danial Hamdan.
Population: 383,786.
 2008 - Population: 951,000 (estimate).
 2011
 28 March: Antigovernment protest.
 13 August: Siege of Latakia.
 2014
 22 September: Ancient tunnel uncovered beneath the National Museum of Latakia.
 2015
 30 September: Khmeimim airbase, an airbase near the Bassel Al-Assad International Airport becomes operational for use by Russian troops.
 2016
 2 June: Suicide bombing near a mosque in the city's center kills three civilians and injures several others.
 14 August: Asma al-Assad, the First Lady of Syria visits the city and attends the graduation ceremony for the 5th batch of students of the National Center for Distinguished Students.
27 November: Al-Manara University opened.
 2017
25 March: Authorities seize large amounts of weapons and ammo that were to be smuggled to terrorists in Latakia.
6 April: Tishreen University Hospital in Lattakia receives new batch of medical aid provided by Russia.
 4 May: Authorities arrest a criminal group responsible for a number of kidnappings and killings in the city and surrounding villages.
 4 September: Terrorist groups launch a missile onto Latakia causing material damage.
 10 October: Over 140 students graduate from the Arab Academy for Science and Technology and Maritime Transport in Latakia.
 24 October: A car rigged with 50 kg of explosives was seized by the authorities near a private hospital. 
 17 November: Prime Minister of Syria Imad Khamis launches plans to rehabilitate the Al-Assad Sports City complex, which was closed temporarily during the civil war and used to house refugees from the city of Aleppo. 
 18 November: A batch of aid sent from Belarus containing canned food, 2500 pieces of clothes and other relief materials arrives in Latakia to be distributed among hundreds of families affected by terrorism in Latakia, Damascus, and Homs.
 25 November: Following the liberation of the city of Deir ez-Zor from ISIL militants, 125 tons of citrus were sent from Latakia to the city of Deir ez-Zor.
 11 December: Russian president Vladimir Putin, accompanied by his Syrian counterpart Bashar al-Assad visits the Khmeimim airbase.

See also
 Latakia history
 History of Latakia (in Arabic)
 Timelines of other cities in Syria: Aleppo, Damascus, Hama, Homs

References

This article incorporates information from the Arabic Wikipedia and French Wikipedia.

Bibliography

 
 
 
 
  (essays on Latakia city history)

External links

  (video)

Years in Syria
Latakia